Novacon is an annual science fiction convention, usually held each November in the English Midlands. Launched in 1971, it has been hosted by the Birmingham Science Fiction Group since 1972.

History
The first Novacon was organised by the University of Aston Science Fiction Group in November 1971, at a time when the Eastercon was the only regular annual sf convention in the UK. The first Novacon was judged a success and its members voted to make it an annual event. The organisation was passed to the recently formed Birmingham Science Fiction Group to ensure continuity from year to year. Since then, Novacon has developed into a fan-centred rather than academic convention, based around a single-stream, structured programme and intended to let its members network and socialise, as well as attend programme items; there are usually also several science-oriented items.

Nova Awards
The annual Nova Awards are presented at Novacon. These are given in the categories of Best Fanzine, Best Fan Writer and Best Fan Artist. In addition, the Novacon committee occasionally presents its own Nova, for Best Fan; historically, recipients have a history of service to Novacon and/or the Birmingham Science Fiction Group.

List of Novacons 

(*Attendance figures taken from individual programme books and may not reflect the final figures; for instance, more than 500 people attended Novacon 14.)

External links 
 Novacon website
 Birmingham SF Group website

Science fiction conventions in the United Kingdom
November events
Autumn events in England
History of Birmingham, West Midlands